Cache Peak, at  above sea level, is the highest peak in the Albion Mountains of Cassia County in Southern Idaho.  Cache Peak is located in the central part of the range southeast of Oakley and north of Almo in the Albion Division of the Minidoka Ranger District of Sawtooth National Forest.

Cache Peak is in the watershed of tributaries of the Snake River, which itself is a tributary of the Columbia River. The peak is a part of the Great Basin Divide and the Basin and Range Province. It is the highest peak in Idaho south of the Snake River Plain, the highest in Cassia County, and north of City of Rocks National Reserve. The peak can be reached via a non-technical hike, and there are several alpine lakes on the east side of the peak.

Cache Peak supports one of the three populations of Cymopterus davisii, a plant that is endemic to the Albion Mountains. The Cache Peak population is considered a single population with Mount Independence.


See also

List of mountain peaks of Idaho
List of mountain peaks of the United States
List of mountain peaks of North America
List of mountains of Idaho
List of mountain ranges in Idaho

References

External links

 Sawtooth National Forest - Official Site

Mountains of Cassia County, Idaho
Mountains of Idaho
Sawtooth National Forest